Abel Molinero Pons (born 28 April 1989) is a Spanish footballer who plays for Águilas FC as a left winger.

Club career
Born in Madrid, Molinero started playing as a senior with local Atlético Madrid's C-team, going on to appear sparingly for the B-side over the course of two Segunda División B seasons. His best output with the latter consisted of nine games and one goal, in 2010–11.

In summer 2011, Molinero signed with UD Almería, being assigned to the reserves also in the third level. He made his debut with the Andalusians' first team on 13 December, coming on as a substitute for Omar in a 1–3 home loss against CA Osasuna for the campaign's Copa del Rey (2–4 on aggregate).

On 26 June 2012, Molinero was definitely promoted to Almería's main squad in Segunda División. On 2 September of the following year, the free agent signed a short-term contract with neighbouring Real Jaén.

On 31 January 2014, after featuring sparingly for Jaén, Molinero joined third division club San Fernando CD. On 8 July, he moved to fellow league team CD Guadalajara.

On 13 July 2015, after scoring 12 goals for the Castile-La Mancha side – playoffs included – Molinero signed a two-year deal with CD Lugo from the second tier.

References

External links

1989 births
Living people
Footballers from Madrid
Spanish footballers
Association football wingers
Segunda División players
Segunda División B players
Tercera División players
Atlético Madrid C players
Atlético Madrid B players
UD Almería B players
UD Almería players
Real Jaén footballers
San Fernando CD players
CD Guadalajara (Spain) footballers
CD Lugo players
CF Fuenlabrada footballers
Real Murcia players
Barakaldo CF footballers
CF Talavera de la Reina players
Lleida Esportiu footballers
Águilas FC players